The following is a comprehensive list of historical structures located within and maintained by the Great Smoky Mountains National Park. Structures at Cades Cove, Roaring Fork, the Noah Ogle Place, and Elkmont are part of U.S. Registered Historic Districts. Nine individual structures in the park are listed on the National Register of Historic Places. All historic structures within the park are maintained under NRHP guidelines, whether they are listed or not.

Cades Cove

Elkmont

Cataloochee

Hazel Creek

Greenbrier

Tyson McCarter Place

The Sugarlands

Noah Ogle Place

Roaring Fork

Little Greenbrier

Oconaluftee

Resources
 Davis, Hattie Caldwell. Cataloochee Valley: Vanished Settlements of the Great Smoky Mountains (Alexander, N.C.: Worldcomm, 1997).
 Dunn, Durwood. Cades Cove: The Life and Death of an Appalachian Community (Knoxville: University of Tennessee Press, 1988).
 Oliver, Duane. Hazel Creek From Then Till Now (Maryville, Tenn.: Stinnett Printing, 1989).
 Robbins, Tim. Mountain Farm Museum Self-Guided Tour (Gatlinburg: Great Smoky Mountains Association, date not given).
 Thomason, Phillip and Williams, Michael.  .  April–July 1993, pp. 8–19.  PDF file.
 Trout, Ed. Historic Buildings of the Smokies (Gatlinburg: Great Smoky Mountains Association, 1995).
 Wear, Jerry. Greenbrier: Lost Communities of Sevier County, Tennessee (Sevierville, Tenn.: Sevierville Heritage Committee, 1985).
 Wear, Jerry. Sugarlands: A Lost Community in Sevier County, Tennessee (Sevierville, Tennessee: Sevierville Heritage Committee, 1986).

External links
 Great Smoky Mountains National Park
Great Smoky Mountains Association – official nonprofit partner of the park, raises funds for restoration of historic structures and publishes all official guide information on the park

Great Smoky Mountains National Park
Great Smoky Mountains
Historical structures maintained by the Great Smoky Mountains National Park
History of North Carolina
History of Tennessee